Living Asia Channel is a 24-hour Asian travel and lifestyle channel. Launched on June 6, 2004. It showcases the best of Asian destinations, finds, culture, cuisine, fashion, people, business, issues and investment opportunities in the Philippines and Asia. This channel is owned by  CCI Asia Group Corp.  and operated by CCI Asia Television.
Living Asia Channel head office is in Quezon City, Philippines
In Asia, Living Asia Channel is available through the communications satellite Agila II of Mabuhay Satellite Corp. (MSC), which has a C-band footprint encompassing Bangladesh, Bhutan, Brunei, Cambodia, China, Hong Kong, India, Indonesia, Japan, Korea, Laos, Malaysia, Mongolia, Maldives, Indonesia, Myanmar, Nepal, East Timor, Singapore, Sri Lanka, Taiwan, Thailand, India, Macau, Vietnam, and Hawaii.

Living Asia Channel is seen on PCTV is available in Americas, Africa, Greater Middle East, North America, Chile, Brazil, Kenya, Europe, the Middle East, and Asia Pacific. In the Asia Pacific region, PCTV is seen in Cambodia; Guam; Hong Kong; Japan; Indonesia; Singapore; New Zealand and in Sydney, Australia.

Living Asia programs are also available 24/7 over IPTV through live video streaming on JumpTV.com and through video-on-demand through Images Asia on ABS-CBNNow!, an ABS-CBN Interactive service.

Living Asia Channel is available in Cable Operators: SkyCable & Destiny Cable (Metro Manila) Channel 113 (Digital), Cablelink (Metro Manila) Channel 102 (Metro Manila), G Sat (Nationwide) Channel 88 and other affiliate cable stations within the Philippines.

In the Philippines, Living Asia Channel is also a dual channel served for the Manila Jockey Club sports feed which is only for SkyCable, Destiny Cable and Sky Direct subscribers.

Programming
 Travel Guide
 Cuisine Asia
 Asian Specials
 Windows
 Celebration
 Our Asia
 Trade Asia
 Glimpses

External links

Television networks in the Philippines
Television channels and stations established in 2004
Travel television